This is a list of members of the London School Board. The board existed from 1870 to 1904 when the London County Council replaced it as the local education authority for the County of London.

Divisions 1870–1885
The London School Board was created by the Elementary Education Act 1870. The act provided that the "Metropolis" (that is the area of the Metropolitan Board of Works) should be divided into ten named divisions for the elections of members to the board. The exact boundaries and numbers of members for each division were fixed by order of Education Department and approved by the Privy Council on 7 October 1870 as follows:

Members 1870–1876

Members 1876–1885
Under the terms of Section 44 of the Elementary Education Act 1876 casual vacancies occurring in the membership of school boards due to death or resignation were no longer filled by-elections but by co-option.

Divisions 1885–1904
For the elections of 1885 the existing Lambeth Division was divided into two:
Lambeth, East (4 seats): the parishes of Camberwell and Newington, London, and corresponding to the parliamentary constituencies of Camberwell North, Camberwell Dulwich, Camberwell, Peckham, Newington, Walworth, Newington West. 
Lambeth, West (6 seats): the parish of Lambeth and the Wandsworth District (Battersea, Clapham, Putney, Streatham, Tooting Graveney and Wandsworth.)

The numbers of elected members increased to fifty-five.

Members 1885–1897

Members 1897–1904

† Elected to the London County Council on 5 March 1904.

References

London School Board, Members list
London School Board, List
London School Board, List
London School Board, Members list
London School Board, List
London School Board, List
London School Board